These are The Official UK Charts Company UK Official Indie Chart number one hits of 1998.

See also
1998 in music

References

United Kingdom Indie Singles
Indie 1998
UK Indie Chart number-one singles